Death's Newlyweds (Spanish: Novios de la muerte) is a 1975 Spanish war film directed by Rafael Gil. The title refers to the famous song about and nickname for Spain's elite light infantry unit, the Spanish Foreign Legion.

Cast
Julián Mateos as Joaquín 'Chimo'
Juan Luis Galiardo as Juan Ramón Soler
Fernando Sancho as Commandant Lauria
Ramiro Oliveros as Ricardo
Helga Liné as Amelia
José Nieto
Mary Begoña as Chimo's mother
Pedro Mari Sánchez
Rafael Hernández as Sergeant Gómez  
Viky Lussón

Luis Induni
Antonio Cintado
Juan Ramón Torremocha
Manuel Torremocha
Leopoldo Francés
Scott Miller
Carlos Ballesteros as Sergeant Santaló

References

External links

1975 war films
Spanish war films
1975 films
1970s Spanish-language films
Films directed by Rafael Gil
Films scored by Gregorio García Segura
Films with screenplays by Rafael J. Salvia
1970s Spanish films